The TVB Anniversary Award for Best Drama Series is one of the TVB Anniversary Awards presented annually by Television Broadcasts Limited (TVB) to producers who have created the most outstanding television drama series aired on the designated year. This award is usually reserved to be one of the last presented, and is considered to be one of the most premier awards of the ceremony.

The award has changed names several times since its institution in 1997. It was first called the Most Popular Television Programme of Hong Kong — Drama (全港最受歡迎電視節目—戲劇類) in 1997, but was changed to My Favourite Television Programme — Drama (我最喜愛的電視節目—戲劇節目) in 1998. The name was finally changed to Best Drama Series (最佳劇集) in 2005.

Winners and nominees
The following is a list of the top 5 (or top 3, depending on the year) nominated drama series since 1997.

1990s

2000s

2010s

2020s

Dramas with multiple awards
6 awards
Heart of Greed
Moonlight Resonance
Rosy Business
A Fist Within Four Walls

5 awards
Line Walker

4 awards
Triumph in the Skies II

3 awards
Wars of In-Laws
Can't Buy Me Love
Lives of Omission
Lord of Shanghai

See also 

List of Asian television awards

External links
Anniversary Awards myTV SUPER

TVB Anniversary Awards